Jorge Sáez Carrillo (born 5 May 1990) is a Spanish footballer who plays for CD Lealtad mainly as a midfielder.

Club career
Born in Madrid, Sáez spent his youth career with local Rayo Vallecano, and made his senior debuts with the reserve team in the 2008–09 season, in the Tercera División. On 24 May 2009 he appeared in his first official game with the main squad, featuring the last ten minutes of the 1–2 home defeat against Elche CF in the Segunda División; he finished the campaign with a further two league appearances, all as a substitute.

On 16 June 2013 Sáez signed a contract with Getafe CF, being assigned to the B-side in Segunda División B. On 12 August of the following year, he moved to fellow league team Burgos CF.

References

External links
 
  (archive)
 

1990 births
Living people
Footballers from Madrid
Spanish footballers
Association football midfielders
Segunda División players
Segunda División B players
Tercera División players
Rayo Vallecano B players
Rayo Vallecano players
Getafe CF B players
Burgos CF footballers
Bergantiños FC players
CD Lealtad players
Spain youth international footballers